Rhabdotosperma ledermannii is a species of flowering plant in the family Scrophulariaceae. It is found in Cameroon and Nigeria. Its natural habitats are subtropical or tropical moist montane forests and subtropical or tropical high-altitude grassland. It is threatened by habitat loss.

References

ledermannii
Flora of Africa
Vulnerable plants
Taxonomy articles created by Polbot